"A Song for You" is a song by Leon Russell, covered by many artists.

Song for You or A Song for You may also refer to:

Film and TV
 A Song for You (TV series), a Canadian music variety television series
 A Song for You (film), a 1933 film directed by Joe May

Music

Albums
 A Song for You (Bizzy Bone album), 2008
 A Song for You (The Carpenters album), 1972
 A Song for You (Ron Carter album), 1978
 A Song for You (Steve Tyrell album), 2018
 A Song for You (The Temptations album), 1975
 A Song for You (alternative title of Andy Williams album), 1971
 Songs for You by Tinashe, 2019

Songs
 "Song for You" (Misia song), 2005
 "A Song for You" (Roh Ji-hoon song), 2014
 "Song for You", by Fairies, 2011
 "Song for You", by Alexi Murdoch from Four Songs
 "Song for You", by Barclay James Harvest from Time Honoured Ghosts
 "Song for You", by Big Time Rush from 24/Seven
 "A Song for You" by Celine Dion from Taking Chances
 "Song for You", by Chicago from Chicago XIV
 "A Song for You", by Gram Parsons from GP
 "Song for You", by The Poodles from Metal Will Stand Tall
 "Song for You", by The Smith Street Band from More Scared of You Than You Are of Me
 "A Song for You", by Whitney Houston from I Look to You

See also
For You (disambiguation) § Songs